Screwed Up is a compilation album by American hip hop quartet Screwball. The double disc project was released on July 19, 2004 via Hydra Entertainment. It is primarily composed of songs from the group's two previous albums Y2K: The Album and Loyalty, as well as new tracks, remixes, and songs from member Hostyle's One Eyed Maniac album. The album's title came from the group's 1996 single "Screwed Up" b/w "They Wanna Know Why". After the release of Screwed Up, member Blaq Poet pursued a solo career. Member Kenneth "KL" Lewis died on March 28, 2008 of an asthma attack, and member Fredrick "Hostyle" Ivey died in January 2020. The compilation was re-issued for digital download shortened to fifteen tracks.

Production was handled by Godfather Don, Mike Heron, Ayatollah, V.I.C., DJ Premier, A Kid Called Roots, Cisco, Eddie Sancho, F Bee, Lee Stone, Marley Marl, Pete Rock, Roger Pauletta and The Beatnuts, with Jerry Famolari serving as executive producer. It features guest appearances from Cormega, Godfather Don, Nature, Capone-N-Noreaga, Fred Fowler, Kool G Rap, Matrix Bars, MC Shan, Mobb Deep, M.O.P., Nashawn, Offdamental and DJ Stretch Armstrong.

Track listing

References

External links

2004 compilation albums
Screwball (group) albums
Hydra Entertainment albums
Albums produced by Ayatollah
Albums produced by Pete Rock
Albums produced by DJ Premier
Albums produced by Marley Marl
Albums produced by the Beatnuts
Albums produced by Godfather Don